Mount Rigel is the highest peak of Orion Massif, Rymill Coast, Palmer Land, Antarctica, with an elevation of . It was mapped by the United States Geological Survey using U.S. Navy aerial photographs taken between 1966 and 1969 and named by the United Kingdom Antarctic Place-Names Committee in 1976 after the star Rigel in the constellation Orion.
 

Mountains of Palmer Land